The 1969 Macdonald Brier, Canada's national men's curling championship was held March 3–7 at the Oshawa Civic Auditorium in Oshawa, Ontario.

The Ron Northcott rink representing Alberta won their third title, having gone undefeated. It was the first time a team had gone undefeated since 1957. It was also the 11th title for Alberta. Northcott became the fourth skip to ever win back-to-back Briers joining Gordon Hudson, Matt Baldwin, and Ernie Richardson (twice).

British Columbia were runners-up, with an impressive 9-1 record, which was usually good enough to win. Both Saskatchewan and Prince Edward Island tied for third place at 7-3 records. It was tied for the best ever result for PEI, which also finished third the previous year.

Teams
The teams are listed as follows:

Round robin standings
Final Round Robin standings:

Round robin results

Draw 1
Monday, March 3

Draw 2
Monday, March 3

Draw 3
Tuesday, March 4

Draw 4
Tuesday, March 4

Draw 5
Wednesday, March 5

Draw 6
Wednesday, March 5

Draw 7
Thursday, March 6

Draw 8
Thursday, March 6

Draw 9
Thursday, March 6

Draw 10
Friday, March 7

Draw 11
Friday, March 7

Awards

All-Star Team 
The media selected the following curlers as All-Stars:

Bernie Sparkes became the first player to be selected to the all-star team four times as he was selected the three previous years as well.

Ross G.L. Harstone Award
The Ross Harstone Award was presented to the player chosen by their fellow peers as the curler who best represented Harstone's high ideals of good sportsmanship, observance of the rules, exemplary conduct and curling ability.

References

2017 Brier Media Guide: Brier Personnel 1927-2017
Results at Soudog Curling

External links
1969 MacDonald Brier on YouTube

1969
Curling in Ontario
1969 in Ontario
March 1969 sports events in Canada
1969 in Canadian curling
Sport in Oshawa